Pwllheli is a market town and community of the Llŷn Peninsula in Gwynedd, north-western Wales. It had a population of 4,076 in 2011 of whom a large proportion, 81%, are Welsh speaking. Pwllheli is the place where Plaid Cymru was founded. It is the birthplace of the Welsh poet Sir Albert Evans-Jones (bardic name Cynan).

Pwllheli has a range of shops and other services. As a local railhead with a market every Wednesday, the town is a gathering point for the population of the whole peninsula.

Etymology
The town's name means salt water basin.

History

The town was given its charter as a borough by Edward, the Black Prince, in 1355, and a market is still held each Wednesday in the centre of the town on 'Y Maes' (="the field" or "the town square" in English).

The town grew around the shipbuilding and fishing industries and the granite quarry at Gimlet Rock.

The population in 1841 was 2,367.

During the 1890s, the town was developed by Solomon Andrews, a Cardiff businessman. This work included the promenade, roads and houses at West End. A tramway was built linking the town to Llanbedrog. The trams ran until 1927 when the section of track between Carreg-y-Defaid and Tyddyn-Caled was seriously damaged by a storm. Andrews ran the Cardiff Road section in 1928, and offered to sell the tramway to Pwllheli Corporation at the end of the season, but they did not take up his offer. He then sold the assets, and the Corporation removed the tracks during the winter of 1928/29.

Poet Albert Evans-Jones, who was an archdruid for the National Eisteddfod of Wales and was known by his bardic name 'Cynan', was born in Pwllheli; before he became an archdruid, he joined the war effort through the Welsh Student Company of the RAMC, serving in Salonika and France, initially as an ambulance driver and medic, later as the company's military chaplain. He was the son of the proprietor of the Central Restaurant in Penlan Street, Pwllheli.

Governance
Pwllheli Town Council consists of fifteen town councillors elected from the North and South wards.

Pwllheli North and Pwllheli South are the county wards covering the town; they each elect one county councillor to Gwynedd Council.

Education
 Ysgol Cymerau, primary school (Welsh medium)
 Ysgol Glan y Môr, secondary school (Welsh medium)

Ysgol Glan y Môr was formed by the merger in 1969 of the former Pwllheli Grammar School at Penrallt and the Frondeg Secondary Modern School in Upper Ala Road, to form a comprehensive school based at two separate sites in the town. The junior pupils (year 1 and year 2) were located at the Penrallt site and the senior pupils (year 3 and upwards) at a new complex in Cardiff Road. This new school was subsequently expanded to accommodate all pupils under the Ysgol Glan y Môr name.

The Penrallt site was later redeveloped as the Pwllheli campus of Coleg Meirion-Dwyfor. The façade of the main building of the old grammar school was retained and incorporated into the design of the current college buildings. Thus the 'old school' is readily seen from the town square (Y Maes) as it has been since the former Pwllheli County School moved to Penrallt in the early 20th century.

Coleg Meirion-Dwyfor (Welsh medium)

Transport

Rail
Pwllheli railway station is the terminus of the Cambrian Coast Railway, running to Machynlleth with services continuing to Shrewsbury and Birmingham. The station is operated and served by Transport for Wales. The rail link to Caernarfon via the Carnarvonshire Railway was axed under the Beeching cuts and as a result it closed in December 1964.

Road
Pwllheli is connected to the wider road network by the A497 to Porthmadog and the A499 to Caernarfon. From there, major roads lead away from Gwynedd to the rest of Wales.

Buses
Buses serve most of the town as well as the rest of the wider Llŷn Peninsula area. Services to Caernarfon give connections to Bangor. Pwllheli bus station is situated in the town centre.

Attractions

 Plas Bodegroes, which until 2009 was a Michelin starred restaurant
 Penarth Fawr, a 15th-century house
 Hafan y Môr, a former Butlins holiday camp now operated by Haven
 Pwllheli Market
 Neuadd Dwyfor, a theatre and cinema located in Penlan Street

Pwllheli has a section of the Wales Coast Path along its shoreline.

Pwllheli Harbour and Hafan Pwllheli 

Pwllheli has a small harbour situated at the confluence between the rivers Afon Erch and Afon Rhyd-Hir.

Hafan Pwllheli is a marina built in Pwllheli Harbour during the 1990s.

Notable people 

 Eleazar Roberts (1825–1912), musician, translator, writer and amateur astronomer.
 Owen Davies (1840–1929), Baptist minister and writer
 Sir (Albert) Cynan Evans-Jones CBE (1895–1970), bardic name of Cynan, was a war poet and dramatist.
 William Richard Williams (1896–1962), Principal of the United Theological College, Aberystwyth
 John Robert Jones (1911–1970), philosopher.
 Hywel Williams (born 1953), Plaid Cymru politician, MP for Arfon, previously Caernarfon, since 2001.
 David Dawson (born 1960), artist
 Gareth Pierce (born 1981) actor and musician

Arts
Pwllheli hosted the National Eisteddfod in 1925 and 1955, as well as an unofficial National Eisteddfod event in 1875.

Language
According to the United Kingdom Census 2011, 80% of the population spoke Welsh.

Sport and leisure
Pwllheli is home to association football team Pwllheli F.C., rugby union team Pwllheli RFC and running club Llŷn Striders. There is a hockey club, Clwb Hoci Pwllheli, which is part of the rugby, cricket and hockey club.

Pwllheli is a hub for water sports, due in part to a marina, Pwllheli Sailing Club, and Plas Heli - the Welsh National Sailing Academy.

The town has two beaches, South Beach and Glan-y-don. South Beach stretches from Gimlet Rock, across the Promenade and West End, towards Penrhos and Llanbedrog. Glan-y-don Beach is on the eastern side of the river mouth and runs for 3 miles (5 km) from behind the marina workshops and out towards Penychain (holiday camp).

The town has a golf club on the Llŷn coastline.

Notes

External links

 Official Website for Pwllheli
 www.geograph.co.uk : photos of Pwllheli and surrounding area

 
Towns in Gwynedd